is a train station located in Kagoshima, Kagoshima, Japan.
The station opened in 1986.

Lines 
Kyushu Railway Company
Ibusuki Makurazaki Line

JR

Adjacent stations

Nearby places
Kagoshima City Tram: Junshin Gakuen-mae tram stop
Kagoshima University
Kagoshima University Elementary School and Junior High School
Kagoshima Junshin Women's College and Junior High School
Kamoike Post Office

Railway stations in Kagoshima Prefecture
Railway stations in Japan opened in 1986